Russell Bromage (born 9 November 1959) is an English former footballer who played as a midfielder. In a fourteen-year career in the Football League he made 400 league appearances, scoring 14 goals.

He spent ten years with Port Vale from 1977 to 1987, winning the club's Player of the Year award in 1980–81, and being named on the PFA Team of the Year (Fourth Division) in 1982–83 and 1984–85, as the club were promoted out of the Fourth Division in 1982–83 and 1985–86. He played a total of 402 games for the club in all competitions, scoring 15 goals. He also spent a brief part of 1983 on loan at Oldham Athletic. He was sold on to Bristol City for £25,000 in August 1987, helping the club to win promotion out of the Third Division in 1989–90. He moved on to Brighton & Hove Albion for a one-season spell in 1990–91, in which he was loaned out to Maidstone United. He later entered Sussex non-league football with Southwick, Littlehampton Town, Shoreham and Whitehawk.

Career

Port Vale
Bromage graduated from the Port Vale youth team to sign professional forms in October 1977, with the club in the Third Division and under the management of Bobby Smith. He made eight appearances in 1977–78 as the club were relegated into the Fourth Division. He then scored on the first day of the 1978–79 season in a 2–2 draw with Scunthorpe United, and then found the net again in a 3–1 win at Doncaster Rovers on 12 September. He finished 1978–79 with two goals in twenty games.

Bromage made thirty appearances in 1979–80, and after being a fringe player under Dennis Butler and Alan Bloor he established himself in the first team under John McGrath. He again scored past Doncaster Rovers, adding the third of a 3–0 win at Vale Park in the last match of the season. He went on to score five goals in 52 appearances in 1980–81, finding the net in a League Cup clash with Tranmere Rovers, before bagging a brace in the league against Tranmere, and adding to his tally with strikes against Bradford City and Hartlepool United. Moved from midfield to left full-back, his performances there he was voted Player of the Year by the club's supporters.

He made another 54 appearances in 1981–82, before he helped the "Valiants" to promotion in 1982–83 with 2 goals in 49 games. He was selected in the PFA Team of the Year for 1982–83, along with teammates Phil Sproson, Geoff Hunter, and Steve Fox. He served as club captain and was rated as an excellent captain by teammate Robbie Earle.

However he refused to sign a new contract for the 1983–84 season, as did teammates Geoff Hunter, Barry Siddall, and Terry Armstrong. He eventually walked out on the club, and played two Second Division games for Oldham Athletic in October. However he returned to Vale Park in November, and agreed to sign a new contract. He went on to finish the campaign with 42 appearances, scoring one goal against Wigan Athletic, as the club were relegated under new manager John Rudge.

Bromage posted 46 appearances in 1984–85, finding the net in a league win over Stockport County and an FA Cup victory over Scunthorpe United. His consistency won him a place on the PFA Team of the Year for a second time. He won his second promotion with the club in 1985–86, posting 51 appearances and scoring one goal, again against Scunthorpe. The 1986–87 campaign would be his last with the club, and he played 51 games, scoring one goal in a defeat at Walsall. He played a total of 402 games for the club in all competitions, scoring 15 goals.

Bristol City
He was sold to Terry Cooper's Bristol City for £25,000 (and Lawrie Pearson) in August 1987. His Port Vale testimonial match was held against rivals Stoke on 13 April 1986, Vale lost the game 1–0. City reached the Third Division play-offs in 1987–88, however lost out to Walsall in the final. An eleventh-place finish followed in 1988–89, before promotion was finally won under Joe Jordan in 1989–90, as City finished in second place, two points behind rivals Bristol Rovers. In all he played 46 league games for the club, scoring one goal.

Later career
Bromage joined Barry Lloyd's Second Division Brighton & Hove Albion for the 1990–91 season, but played only one game in their run to the play-off final. He instead joined Fourth Division Maidstone United on loan, playing three games.

Bromage later served Southwick as a player-manager and Littlehampton Town as player-manager. He also played for Shoreham, before being appointed joint manager with John Byrne in August 1997. The pair managed the Sussex County League side for two seasons. Bromage was appointed player manager of Whitehawk for the 2007–08 season and oversaw a second-place finish in the Sussex County League.

Later life
After retiring from football Bromage moved to Shoreham-by-Sea and set up a window cleaning business. He also worked for Opta Sports providing reports on match-days.

Career statistics
Source:

Honours
Individual
PFA Fourth Division Team of the Year: 1982–83 & 1984–85
Port Vale F.C. Player of the Year: 1980–81

Port Vale
Football League Fourth Division 3rd-place finish (promoted): 1982–83
Football League Fourth Division 4th-place finish (promoted): 1985–86

Bristol City
Football League Third Division 2nd-place finish (promoted): 1989–90

References

1959 births
Living people
Footballers from Stoke-on-Trent
Association football midfielders
English footballers
Port Vale F.C. players
Oldham Athletic A.F.C. players
Bristol City F.C. players
Brighton & Hove Albion F.C. players
Maidstone United F.C. (1897) players
Southwick F.C. players
Littlehampton Town F.C. players
Whitehawk F.C. players
English Football League players
Association football coaches
Association football player-managers
English football managers
Southwick F.C. managers
Littlehampton Town F.C. managers
Whitehawk F.C. managers